Eschatotypa melichrysa is a species of moth in the family Tineidae. It was described by Edward Meyrick in 1880. This species is endemic to New Zealand. Meyrick regarded them as common in Wellington and Dunedin, in December and January. He obtained specimens from beating forest growth.

References

External links
Image of type specimen of Eschatotypa melichrysa

Moths described in 1880
Tineidae
Moths of New Zealand
Endemic fauna of New Zealand
Taxa named by Edward Meyrick
Endemic moths of New Zealand